This is a complete list of compositions by Joaquín Turina.

The list is categorized by Genre, and can be sorted in order of composition date (and Opus number order) by clicking on the "Opus" header. (To return to genre categories, reload the webpage.)

List of compositions

References
Sources
 Joaquín Turina. Sitio oficial. Joaquín Turina, Official Website
 Romero, Justo (2004-). "Complete Piano Music. Jordi Masó, piano". Naxos (CD).

External links
 List of works at joaquinturina.com
 IMSLP List of works by Joaquín Turina with links to free downloadable scores

 
Turina, Joaquín, compositions by